Novaya Kurba (Shene Khürbe) is a rural locality (a selo) in Zaigrayevsky District, Republic of Buryatia, Russia. The population was 484 as of 2010. There are 8 streets.

Geography 
Novaya Kurba is located 41 km northeast of Zaigrayevo (the district's administrative centre) by road. Staraya Kurba is the nearest rural locality.

References 

Rural localities in Zaigrayevsky District